The following is a non-exhaustive list of notable compositions for the double bass.

Solo works

 Beth Anderson
 May Swale
 Lera Auerbach
 Monolog for double bass solo (1996) (2009)
 Memory of tango: for double bass solo (2002)
 Katarzyna Bortkun-Szpotan'ska
 Cael (1982)
 Ina Bottelier
 Raga: "Sunrise for double bass solo" (1985) (2000)
 Rosemary Clarke
 Fantasy for Double Bass (1988)
 LySippus' Apoxyomenos (1988)
 Happenings (1973)
 Christine Elise Chen
 Solo Piece For Double Bass (2014)
 Mary Ellen Childs
 Unfettered
 Virginia Conton
 Ram (1977)
 Hanne Darboven
 Opus 17A
Hans Fryba
 Suite in the Olden Style for solo double bass
 Margaret Marie Dare
 Study in G minor; Study in D minor; A Minor Major Study; Bowing Study in 3/8; Study in D major
 Study in E minor; Semi quaver Study, In "Yorke Studies, Vol. 1." (1972)
 Deirdre Gribbin
 Maps of Awakening (2021)
 Sofia Gubaidulina
 Eight etudes (preludes): for double bass solo (1974)
 5 Etudes (1965)
 Pantomime (1966)
 Sonata (1976) pub. Sikorski (1991)
 Tatar Dance (1992)
 "Ein EngeL" (1994)
 Galgenlieder (a3) (Christian Morgenstern) (1995-96)
 Galgenlieder (a5) (Christian Morgenstern) (1996)
 Sadie Harrison
 Sparring with Shadows (2013)
 Teppo Hauta-aho
 Kadenza
Raphsody for double bass solo
 Alyssa Hess
 One After Another (1977)
 Hans Werner Henze
 Serenade for cello transcribed for double bass
 Dorothy Hindman
 Time management (2004) (2017)
 Eva-Maria Houben
 Archipelagos
 Nachtstück
 Catherine Lamb
 Mirror
 Joëlle Léandre
 Taxi (1987)
 Bass Drum
 A voix Basse (1981)
 Octobre (1989)
 For Peter H. (2005)
 Temoignege
 Anne LeBaron
 Inner Voice (2003)
 Annea Lockwood
 Deep Dream Dive (1973)
 Secret Life (1989)
 Giulia Lorusso
 Let it Come
 Henri O'Kelly jr.
 Polyorgane (pub'd 1920)
 Behzad Ranjbaran
 Ballade for Unaccompanied Contrabass (1999)
 Kajia Saariaho
 Folia
 Lisa Bost-Sangberg
 Chroma: from worldlessness: contrabass (2018)
 Rebecca Saunders
 Fury
 Amy Williams
 Don't Tell Susan (1992)
 Ian Wilson
 Pianura (2004)
 Peteris Vasks
 Bass Trip

Two or more basses
 Sofia Gubaidulina
 Mirage: The Dancing Sun
 Kazuko Hayakawa
 Haiku (1991)
 Bertold Hummel
Sinfonia piccola for 8 double basses (1978)
 Kristin Korb
 On the Prowl (2005) for 4 double basses
 Bernhard Alt
 Suite For Four Double Basses
 Joseph Lauber
 Quartet for Double Basses

Chamber works

 Els Aarne
 Sonata for Double Bass and Piano Op. 63 (1980)
 Kyoko Abe
 Quartet (Ariadne) (1980)
 Esther Aeschlimann-Roth
 Die Zeiten Andern Sich, 7 Audiovisual Pieces (1984)
 Nachte (1985)
 Stmfen (1985)
 Tage (1985)
 Flicker-teppich (1983)
 Ein Baum ist ein  Baum ist ein Baum (1986)
 Crisalida (1996) 
 Secoli 
 Spazio
 Elaine Agnew
 Rite On! (1995)
 Peg Ahrens
 And then you laughed (1974)
 Together Again (1971)
 Kathryn Alexander
 Lemon Drops (1998) (2001) for baritone voice, double bass, and mixed percussion 
 Eleanor Alberga
 Animal Banter (1989)
 Luna Alcalay
 Trio (1964)
 Kristi Allik
 L. A. (1979)
 Birgitte Alsted
 Timileskoven
 Beth Anderson
  Ghent Swale for Double Bass and Piano (2001)
 Skater's Suite (1979)
 Anna Amalie, Princess of Prussia
 Trio (1767-87)
 Caroline Ansink
 On my Volcano (1994)
 José Antônio Rezende de Almeida Prado (1943-2010)
 4 Corais, for double bass and piano
 Violet Archer
 Six Miniatures for String Bass and Piano (1984) (1986)
 Pauline Louise Henriette Aubert
 Two Melodies. Senart (1912)
 May Aufderheide
 Dusts
 The Thriller
 Maya Badian
 Dialogues: trumpet and double-bass = trompette et contrebasse
 Elaine Barkin
 NB Suite
 Carol Barnett
 El Tango Languido (1984)
 Amy Beach transcription for double bass by Alexander Verster
 Romance
 Sally Beamish
 Dances and Nocturnes (1986)
 Five Changing Pictures
 Janet Beat
 Convergences (1992)
 Gustavo Becerra-Schmidt (1925-2010)
 Sonata, for double bass and piano
 Kirsty Beilharz
 Earth Essence: Air, Earth, Water, Stars (1993)
 Carla Huston Bell
 Ode to Martin Luther King (1976)
 Sylvia Bergen
 Festival Frolic 
 Johanna Beyer
 Movement for Double Bass and Piano (1936) (1996)
 Movement for String Quartet (1938) 
 Annesley Black
 Lauf: für neun Musiker (2005)
 Victoria Bond
 C-A-G-E-D (1972)
 Seesaw (1987)
 Old New Borrowed Blues (1986)
 Maria Bonzanigo
 La Gatta (1990)
Giovanni Bottesini
Romanza: Une bouche aimeé, for soprano, double bass and piano
Terzetto: Tutto che il mondo serra (transcription of Etude No.19 in C-sharp minor, Op.25/7 by Chopin) for soprano, double bass and piano
Rêverie, for double bass and piano
 Linda Bouchard
 Propos Nouveaux (1988)
 Web Trap (1982)
 Icy Cruise (1984)
 Possible Nudity (1987)
 Risky. Maurice Tourigny (1993)
 Nadia Boulanger
 Three Pieces for Cello and Piano
 Margaret Susan Brandman
 Jazz Impressions (1976)
 Flights of Fancy (1976)
 Nancy Louise Briggs
 Little Song (1982)
 Elizabeth Brown
 Field Guide (1986) 
 Figures in a Landscape (1995)
 Heidi Bruggmann
 Landler; Marches; Polkas; Schottisches; Waltzes
 Joanna Bruzdowicz-Titel
 Party Contra (1982)
 Dorothy Buchanon
 Three Jacques Prevert Settings (1971) 
 Dawn Buckholz 
 20 Century Duets for Strings (1989)
 Diana Burrell
 Angelus (1986)
 Cheryl Camm
Trombone Sonata (1988)
 Karen Campbell
 Only One (1974)
 Duo for Double Bass and Piano
 Edith Canat de Chizy 
 Black-Light (1986)
 Constanza Capdeville
 In sommo pacis. 1980. Ob, va, db, pf. 58.
 Valse, valsa, vals: Keuschheits Waltz (1987)
 1+1+1+1 (1989)
 Memoriae, quasi una fantasia I
 Ida Carroll
 Three Pieces for Double Bass. Forsyth Bros. Db, pf. 44, 66.
 Five National Dances [Five Simple Pieces] (1988) 
 Monic Cecconi-Botella
 Histoire Breve II. Philippa (1968)
 Julia Cenova
 Music In the Pause (1988)
 Monday to Friday, Jazz Cycle (1984)
Paulo C. Chagas (1953)
Canzona I, for double bass and piano
 Janine Charbonnier
 240 joursa mEtEo (1982)
 Mary Elizabeth Chaves
 Silentium (1979)
 Rhona Clarke
 SoundWorks Suite No. 2 for Young Players (1995)
 Rosemary Clarke
 Suite (1966)
 Serpents-Soldiers (1969)
 Harry Crowl (1958)
 Aethra II, for double bass and piano
 Jeanne Colin-De Clerk
 Trio, op. 10 (1969)
 Lizzie Cook
 Move On (1987)
 Constance Cooper
 The Hour of the Shepard (1989)
 Esther Wallach Crane 
 Cords (1977)
 Margaret Marie Dare
 Minuet
 Tina Davidson
 Wait for the End of Dreaming (1984)
 Quintet (1981)
 Jean-Marie Depeisenaire
 Sous la neige (1968)
 Margaret DeWys
 St. Jeronimo Variations (1991)
 Arline Diamond
 Bass Solo (1965)
 Lycia DiBiase Bidart
 Adulto e Crianco (1976)
 Tamar Diesendruck
 The Orchestra (1993)
 Violeta Dinescu-Lucaci
 Satya III (1981)
 Satya V (1981)
 Sonatina (1982)
 Sleep Song (1982)
 Toy (1982)
 Figuren 1 (1990)
 Scherzo da Fantasia IV (1992)
 Elaine Dobson
 Two Ruthies (1971)
 Isobel Dunlop
 Ardkinglas Suite (1967)
 Dorothy Smith Dushkin
 Fantasy for Three
 Percussion Plus, Suite
 Rosemary Duxbury
 Three Dances (1989)
 Sylvia Eichenwald
 Sie erlischt (1977)
 Adrienne Elisha
 Quintet (1996)
 Caroline Emery
 Bass is Beautiful, Vol. 1. 120 melodies
 Caroline Emery and Carol Barratt and Sheila Joynes
 Bass is Beautiful, Vol. 2. 72 melodies: 48 by Emery, 7 arr. Emery, 1 by Sheila Joynes. 23 accompaniments by Carol Barratt
 Rachel Amelia Eubanks
 Three Songs (1984)
 Mary Even-or
 Dances (1961)
 Louise Farrenc
 Piano Quintet No. 1 in a minor, op. 30. Costallat (1842)
 Piano Quintet No. 2 in E, op. 31. Costallat (1845)
 Vivian Fine
 Melos (1964)
 Graciane Finzi
 Songes (1973-74)
 Processus 2 (1986)
 Elena Firsova
 Rakovina [Sea Shell]
 Susan Fisher
 Song of Vanessa (1976)
 Honore a B (1983)
 Jennifer Fowler
 Echoes from an Antique Land (1983)
 Restless Dust (1988)
 Erika Fox
 Pas de Deux (1981)
 Dorothea Franchi
 A Man of Life Upright
 Sherilyn Gail Fritz
 Childhoods Ago (1978)
 Janina Garscia-Gressel
 Miniatures (1970)
 Brigitte Gauthier
 Improvisation et Final (1956)
 Debra Lynn Ginsberg
 Polyphony 2
 Ruth Gipps
 Introduction and Carol, op 71 (1988)
 Suzanne Giraud
 Episode en forme d'oubli (1989)
 Bleu et Ombre. Visage (1993)
 Peggy Glanville-Hicks
 Girondelle for Giraffes (1978)
 Diana R. Green
 Rigorisms, no. 2 (1982)
 Maria Grenfell
 Concertino (1995)
 Margaret Ann Griebling-Haigh
 Sonata
 Deena Grossman
 Music of Spaces; Asunder; Expanses; Ellipse; Unfolding (1983)
 Sea Cliff Hands Quartet 
 Grzondziel, Eleonora. Sonata (1966)
Radamés Gnattali (1906-1988)
Canção e dança, for double bass and piano
Valsa triste, for saxophone, double bass and piano
 Sofiya Gubaidulina
 Sonata for double bass and piano
 Pantomime (1966) (1991)
 Elizabeth Gyring 
 Concert Piece; Largo
 Ann Hanskausen
 Duo
 Sadie Harrison
 A Journey, (2015) (2016)
 Harlequinade (2012)
 Theo's Lullaby (2021)
 Flower of the cherry
 Robin's lullaby: for double bass & piano (2015)
 Theo's Toddle (2013)
 Sorrel Hays
 Tuning, no. 1 (1978)
 Hedstr~m,Ase
 Touche (1996)
 František Hertl
 Sonata for Double Bass and Piano (1946)
 Moya Henderson
 Clearing the Air (1974)
 Paul Hindemith
 Sonata for Double bass and Piano
 Imogen Clare Holst
 Homage to William
 Eleanor Hovda
 Journey music (1981)
 Music from Several Summers (1972)
Earth runner (1966)
 Firefall (1979)
 Gargoyles
 Oracles (1976)
 Solo for Anthony (1973)
 Bertold Hummel (1925-2002)
 Sonatina for double bass and piano (1979)
 Anne LeBaron
 Fertility (1971) for flute, marimba, 2 bongos, and double bass
Arthur Lourié (1892-1966)
Sonata for violin and double bass
 Cecilia McDowall
 Blue Giant (2000)
 Cindy McTee
 Changes (1996) (2013)
Flo Menezes  (1962)
Apologia dos Arquétipos, for double bass and piano
 Florentine Mulsant
 Sonate pour contrebasse et piano op. 52 (2014)
 Pauline Oliveros
 Double Basses at Twenty Paces - For two basses, their seconds, referee and tape
 Trio for Accordion, Trumpet and String Bass (1961)
 Blue Heron: In Memory of James Tenney for Piano and string bass (2006)
 Epigraphs in the Time of Aids for Accordion, Trombone, Keyboard
 Sergei Prokofjev
 Quintet in G minor, Op. 39 
Behzad Ranjbaran (1955)
Dance of Life for Violin and Contrabass (1990)
 Elizabeth Raum
 A poet's day for soprano and string bass
 Arabesque for English horn and double bass
 Franz Schubert
 Trout Quintet in A major, D.667
 Alexander Shchetynsky
 Seven Screen Shots for double bass and piano (2005)
 Germaine Tailleferre
  Impressionisme for flute, double bass and two pianos
Raul do Valle (1936)
Interação, for double bass and piano
 Ellen Taaffe Zwilich
 Excursion (2017) for bass and piano

Concertante works

Concertos

 Els Aarne
 Concerto for Double Bass (1968) double bass and orchestra
 Ardashes Agoshian
 Concerto for Double Bass and a cappella choir "Romeo and Juliet" (2011)
 Kalevi Aho
 Double Bass Concerto (2005)
 Mauricio Annunziata
 Concerto No. 1 for Double Bass and Orchestra "Argentino", Op. 123 (2015)
 Concerto No. 2 for Double Bass and Orchestra "Afroargentino", Op. 125 (2015)
 Concerto No. 3 for Double Bass and Orchestra "Porteño", Op. 129 (2016)
 Francine Aubin
 Concert pour Ariane (1988)
 Judith Bailey
 Double Bass Concerto in the Style of Haydn (2008) (2017)
 Ragnhild Berstad
 Origo (1989-91) for Solo Double Bass and String Quartet
 Anatoly Bogatyrev
 Double bass concerto (1964)
 Giovanni Bottesini
 Gran Concerto in F minor
 Concerto No. 2 in B minor
 Concerto No. 3 in A major (concerto di bravura)
 Joanna Bruzdowicz-Titel
 Concerto (1982)
 Antonio Capuzzi
 Concerto in D (F) major
 Georgi Conus
 Concerto in h moll, op.29 (1910)
 Andrzej Cwojdziński
 Concerto
 Peter Maxwell Davis
 Strathclyde Concerto No. 7 for Double Bass and Orchestra (1992)
 Carl Ditters von Dittersdorf
 Concerto in E major
 Concerto No. 2 in E Major
 Domenico Dragonetti
 Concerto in G major, D290
 Concerto in D dur
 Concerto in A major no 3
 Concerto in A major no 5
 Concerto in A major (Nanny)
 Pere Valls i Duran
Gran Concert Obligat 
 Fernand Fontaine
 Concerto As dur
 Jean Françaix
 Concerto for double bass and orchestra (1974)
 Harald Genzmer
 Concerto for Kontrabass and String Orchestra (1996)
 Thomas Goss
 Double Bass Concerto in E Minor
Jamie Tait-Glossop
Concerto in D major, Op. 5
 Teppo Hauta-aho
 Hippovariaatioita putkessa ja ilman (Hippo-Variations Within a Tube Without, 1983)
 Hans Werner Henze
 Double Bass Concerto (1966)
Franz Anton Hoffmeister
 Concerto No. 1 in D major
 Concerto No. 2 in D major
 Concerto No. 3 in D major
 Robin Holloway
 Concerto for Double Bass and Small Orchestra Op. 83 (2002)
 Fredrik Högberg
Hitting the First Base, concerto for double bass and strings
 Jiří Hudec
 Burleska for double bass and orchestra (1981)
 Gordon Jacob
 Concerto for Double Bass (1972)
 Tadeusz Zygfryd Kassern
 Concerto op. 12 for Double-bass solo
 Serge Koussevitsky
 Concerto in F minor, Op. 3 (1902)
 Edward Kravchuk
 Concerto for Double Bass, Drum set, Piano and Strings (2014) 
 Serge Lancen
 Concerto pur contrebasse et cordes
 Anne Lauber
 Intermizzo #1) for double bass and orchestra
 Juliusz Łuciuk
 Concerto for Double Bass and Orchestra 
 Raymond Luedeke
 Concerto for Double Bass and Orchestra (1997)
 Gennady Lyashenko
 Concerto for Double bass and chamber orchestra (1989)
 Rolf Martinsson
 Double Bass Concerto
 Missy Mazzoli
 "Dark With Excessive Bright" for double bass and strings
 Edgar Meyer
 Concerto in D for Double Bass and Orchestra (2002)
 Virgilio Mortari
 Concerto per Franco Petracchi
 Edouard Nanny
 Concerto in E minor
 Wenzel Pichl
 Concerto in D major
 Stefan Boleslaw Poradowski
Double Bass Concerto
 Behzad Ranjbaran
 Concerto for Double Bass and Orchestra (2018)
 Elizabeth Raum
 Concerto for Double Bass and orchestra (1993/1995)
 Einojuhani Rautavaara
 Angel of Dusk, concerto for double bass and orchestra (1980)
 Anthony Ritchie
 Whalesong (2006)
 Malcolm D Robertson
 Concerto for Double Bass & small orchestra (2020)
 Aldemaro Romero
 Concierto risueño
 Nino Rota
 Divertimento Concertante for double bass and orchestra (1968–1973)
 Rebecca Saunders
 Fury II (2009)
 Tatyana Pavlovna Sergeyeva
 Concerto (1980)
 Nikos Skalkottas
 Double Bass Concerto (1942)
 Johannes Matthias Sperger
 Concerto in D major, No. 15
 Eduard Tubin
 Double Bass Concerto (1948)
 Johann Baptist Wanhal
 Concerto in E major
 Inna Abramovna Zhvanetskaia
 Concerto for Double Bass and Orchestra (1978)

Other concertante works

Concertos with other solo instruments

References